Girth may refer to:

Mathematics
 Girth (functional analysis), the length of the shortest centrally symmetric simple closed curve on the unit sphere of a Banach space
 Girth (geometry), the perimeter of a parallel projection of a shape
 Girth (graph theory), the length of a shortest cycle contained in a graph
 Matroid girth, the size of the smallest circuit in a matroid

Music and entertainment
 Girth (album), 1997 album by heavy metal band Winters Bane
 Girth (Pushing Daisies), an episode of the TV show Pushing Daisies
 Girth (song), the former name of the Guns N' Roses song "Coma"

Other
 Girth (tack), a piece of equipment used to keep a saddle in place on a horse
 Girth (tree), measurement of the circumference of a tree trunk above its base